Zombies are fictional creatures usually portrayed as reanimated corpses or virally infected human beings. They are commonly portrayed as anthropophagous in nature—labelling them as cannibals would imply zombies are still members of the human species, and expert opinions quoted in some of the films below, e.g. Dawn of the Dead, specifically state this is not the case. While zombie films generally fall into the horror genre, some cross over into other genres, such as comedy, science fiction, thriller, or romance. Distinct subgenres have evolved, such as the "zombie comedy" or the "zombie apocalypse". Zombies are distinct from ghosts, ghouls, mummies, Frankenstein's monsters or vampires, so this list does not include films devoted to these types of undead.

Victor Halperin's White Zombie, released in 1932, is often cited as the first zombie film.

Films

See also 
 List of apocalyptic and post-apocalyptic fiction
 List of zombie video games
 List of zombie novels
 List of zombie short films and undead-related projects
 List of vampire films
 List of zombie Nazi films
Zombie comedy

References

Bibliography

External links 
 IMDb – Keyword Zombie

 
z